New Sounds by Pete Rugolo is an album by composer, arranger and conductor Pete Rugolo, featuring performances recorded in 1954 and 1955 for Columbia Records and first released on the budget Harmony label in 1957.

Reception 

Allmusic rated the album with 4 stars.

Track listing 
All compositions by Pete Rugolo, except where indicated.
 "Shave and a Haircut" – 3:15
 "Latin Nocturne" – 2:51
 "The Shrike" (José Ferrer) – 3:50
 "Poinciana (Song of the Tree)" (Nat Simon, Buddy Bernier) – 2:17
 "Manhattan Mambo" (Al Frisch, Allan Roberts) – 2:58
 "Quiet Village (Cha-Cha-Cha)" (Les Baxter) – 2:57
 "When Your Lover Has Gone" (Einar Aaron Swan) – 3:51
 "When You're Smiling (The Whole World Smiles With You)" (Mark Fisher, Joe Goodwin, Larry Shay) – 2:10
 "Come Back Little Rocket" – 2:31
 "You Stepped Out of a Dream" (Nacio Herb Brown, Gus Kahn) – 2:12
Recorded in Los Angeles, CA on February 8, 1954 (track 9), February 24, 1954 (track 10), April 29, 1954 (track 4), May 10, 1954 (track 2), June 21, 1954 (tracks 1 & 3), July 8, 1954 (track 5), February 11, 1955 (tracks 6 & 8) and in New York City on October 11, 1954 (track 7).

Personnel 

Pete Rugolo – arranger, conductor
Pete Candoli (tracks 1–5, 9 & 10), Buddy Childers (tracks 4 & 6), Larry Fain (track 7), Maynard Ferguson (tracks 1–6, 9 & 10), Conrad Gozzo (tracks 2, 9 & 10) Mickey Mangano (track 5), Leon Meriam (track 7), Doug Mettome (tracks 7), Don Paladino (tracks 1 & 3), Uan Rasey (track 6), Shorty Rogers (tracks 1–6, 9 & 10), John Wilson (track 7) – trumpet
Milt Bernhart (tracks 1–6 & 8–10), Eddie Bert (track 7), Harry Betts (tracks 4–6, 9 & 10), Bob Fitzpatrick (tracks 1 & 3–6), Milt Gold (track 7), John Halliburton (tracks 1–3, 9 & 10), Herbie Harper (tracks 1–3, 5, 6, 9 & 10), Frank Rehak (track 7), Kai Winding (track 7) – trombone
George Roberts – bass trombone (tracks 2 & 4)
John Cave (tracks 1–3), Vincent DeRosa (tracks 4 & 6), Joe Eager (track 10), Fred Fox (tracks 9 & 10), John Graas (tracks 5, 6, 8 & 9), Sinclair Lott (tracks 1–5), Stan Paley (track 7), Julius Watkins (track 7) – French horn
Bill Barber (track 7), Paul Sarmento (tracks 1–6 & 8–10) – tuba
Harry Klee (tracks 1–3, 6, 9 & 10), Ethmer Roten (tracks 4 & 5) – piccolo, alto saxophone
Bud Shank – flute, alto saxophone (tracks 1–6 & 8–10)
Herbie Mann – flute, piccolo, alto saxophone (track 7)
Dave Schildkraut – alto saxophone, clarinet (track 7)
Bob Cooper – tenor saxophone, oboe (tracks 1–6 & 8–10)
Chase Dean, Joe Megro – tenor saxophone, clarinet (track 7)
Jimmy Giuffre – tenor saxophone, baritone saxophone (tracks 1–6, 9 & 10)
Bob Gordon (tracks 1–6, 9 & 10), Marty Flax (track 7) – baritone saxophone
Gordon ell (track 7), Russ Freeman (track 6), Claude Williamson (tracks 1–5, 9 & 10) – piano
Laurindo Almeida (tracks 1 & 3), Perry Lopez (track 7), Howard Roberts (tracks 2, 4, 5, 6 & 8–10) – guitar
Harry Babasin (track 1–6 & 8–10), Whitey Mitchell (track 7) – bass
Shelly Manne (tracks 1–6 & 8–10), Jerry Segal (track 7) – drums
Bernie Mattison – timpani, percussion (tracks 1–4, 6, 9 & 10)
Jack Costanzo – bongos (track 6)
Teddy Sommer – percussion (track 7)
Ralph Hensel – xylophone (track 5)
Frank Guerrero – timbales (track 5)
Joe Guerrero – bongos, percussion (track 5)
Lynn Franklyn – vocals (track 5)

References 

1957 albums
Pete Rugolo albums
Harmony Records albums
Albums arranged by Pete Rugolo
Albums conducted by Pete Rugolo